Methyl carbamate (also called methylurethane, or urethylane) is an organic compound and the simplest ester of carbamic acid (H2NCO2H). It is a colourless solid.

Methyl carbamate is prepared by the reaction of methanol and urea:
CO(NH2)2  +  CH3OH   →   CH3OC(O)NH2  +  NH3
It also forms in the reaction of ammonia with methyl chloroformate or dimethyl carbonate.

Safety and occurrence
Unlike its close relative ethyl carbamate it is not mutagenic in Salmonella (it tested negative in the Ames test), but it is mutagenic in Drosophila.  Experimental evidence does show that it is a carcinogen in rats, and not carcinogenic in mice. The compound is "known to the state of California to cause cancer" per Proposition 65.

Production, use, and exposure
The compound was detected in wines preserved with dimethyl dicarbonate.

Methyl carbamate is used primarily in the textile and polymer industries as a reactive intermediate. In the textile industry, it is used in the manufacture of dimethylol methyl carbamate-based resins that are applied on polyester cotton blend fabrics as durable-press finishes. The treated fabrics have good crease-angle retention, resist acid souring in commercial laundries, do not retain chlorine, and have flame-retardant properties. Methyl carbamate also is used in the manufacture of pharmaceuticals, insecticides, and urethane.

N-Methyl carbamates are widely used as insecticides. They have anticholinesterase activity without a cumulative effect.

See also
Carbamate
Ethyl carbamate (urethane)

References

External links
MSDS
1987 NIH study of methyl carbamate's carcinogenicity (PDF file)

Methyl esters
Carbamates